Big Springs, Texas, is an unincorporated community in the Rusk County, Texas, United States.

References

Unincorporated communities in Texas
Unincorporated communities in Rusk County, Texas